The Golden Rondelle Theater is a historic theater currently located in the administration complex of S. C. Johnson & Son in Racine, Wisconsin. Featuring a radical design, the theater was originally part of the 1964-65 World's Fair before being moved to Racine. At the World's Fair the theater was used to show the award-winning film To Be Alive!. After the fair, the theater was dismantled, shipped to Racine, and used as the basis of a re-designed theater. The design work was by Taliesin Associated Architects, the successor firm to that of Frank Lloyd Wright.

References

Buildings and structures in Racine, Wisconsin
Tourist attractions in Racine, Wisconsin
Relocated buildings and structures in Wisconsin
Theatres in Wisconsin
1964 establishments in New York City
Theatres completed in 1964
World's fair architecture in the United Kingdom
1964 New York World's Fair